Petr Weigl (16 March 1939 – 14 July 2018) was a Czech director and playwright.

Biography 
In 1961 he graduated from the Prague Film School and the Academy of Performing Arts Television. He worked in the cinema, on television (1961-1976), at the National Theatre (Narodni divadlo, 1976–1991). He created a number of short and feature films for the Czech and Slovak Television, as well as for German public channels ARD and ZDF, British channels BBC and Channel 4. He was twice nominated for the Emmy Award.

He worked in the theaters of Paris and Munich. A major success was the production of Richard Strauss's opera Salome in the Deutsche Oper in Berlin.

Works 

 1977: Rusalka (Dvorak)

References

External links
  
Petr Weigl v archivu ND

1939 births
2018 deaths
Writers from Brno
Czech theatre directors
Czech film directors
Czech screenwriters
Male screenwriters
Film people from Brno
Recipients of the Thalia Award